Royville is a commune in Upper Normandy, France.

Royville may also refer to:
Royville, Indiana, an unincorporated community
Royville, Kentucky, a community in Russell County, Kentucky